Capparis discolor is a species of plant in the Capparaceae family. It is found in Colombia, Costa Rica, Mexico, Nicaragua, and Panama. It is threatened by habitat loss.

References

discolor
Flora of Colombia
Flora of Costa Rica
Flora of Mexico
Flora of Nicaragua
Flora of Panama
Near threatened biota of Mexico
Near threatened flora of South America
Taxonomy articles created by Polbot
Plants described in 1897